Symphyotrichum oblongifolium (formerly Aster oblongifolius), commonly known as aromatic aster or oblong-leaved aster, is a species of flowering plant in the family Asteraceae and is native to parts of the eastern and central United States.

Description
It blooms August–November with many flower heads in various shades of purple.

Distribution and habitat
Aromatic aster is found in parts of Kansas, Ohio, northern Illinois, hilly parts of southern Illinois, and on the banks of the Mississippi River and Illinois River, as well as other parts of the central United States. It is found in Missouri, along the Ohio River, and from Pennsylvania to Nebraska to Minnesota to Virginia.

Conservation
, NatureServe listed Symphyotrichum oblongifolium as Secure (G5) worldwide; Critically Imperiled (S1) in Colorado and North Carolina; Imperiled (S2) in Wyoming; and, Vulnerable (S3) in Indiana and Ohio.

Citations

References

External links

oblongifolium
Flora of the United States
Flora of Northeastern Mexico
Plants used in traditional Native American medicine
Plants described in 1818
Taxa named by Thomas Nuttall